is a passenger railway station  located in the city of Sanda, Hyōgo Prefecture, Japan. It is operated by the West Japan Railway Company (JR West).

Lines

Station layout
The station consists of one ground-level side platform and one island platform connected to the station building by a footbridge. The station has a Midori no Madoguchi staffed ticket office.

Platforms

Adjacent stations

History
Hirono Sation opened on 25 March 1899, as a station of Hankaku Railway, which was nationalized in 1907. With the privatization of the Japan National Railways (JNR) on 1 April 1987, the station came under the aegis of the West Japan Railway Company.

Station numbering was introduced in March 2018 with Hirono being assigned station number JR-G63.

Passenger statistics
In fiscal 2016, the station was used by an average of 1159 passengers daily

Surrounding area
 Sanda City Hirono Civic Center
 Sanda City Hirono Elementary School

See also
List of railway stations in Japan

References

External links 

 Hirono Station from JR-Odekake.net 

Railway stations in Hyōgo Prefecture
Railway stations in Japan opened in 1899
Sanda, Hyōgo